Setting The Woods On Fire is a studio album by The Walkabouts.

Critical reception 
Jason Ankeny, for AllMusic, wrote: "A sweeping, stately record, it owes a great deal to the Stones' Exile on Main St." The Encyclopedia of Popular Music called the album "a strong collection of original material." Trouser Press called it "consistently ace," writing that "strong tunes like 'Firetrap', 'Good Luck Morning' and the rousing, horn-driven 'Hole in the Mountain' [are] given a spiky, full-bodied grace." Uncut deemed it an "underselling classic" that "captures perfectly [the band's] haunted experimentalism." CMJ New Music Monthly wrote that the album's "disposition is pensive and vaguely ominous throughout."

Track listing
All songs by the Walkabouts (c)1994, Fire & Skill Publishing (BMI), administrated worldwide by Bug Music Inc.
Good Luck Morning – 4:13
Firetrap – 5:39
Bordertown – 5:51
Feeling No Pain – 5:12
Old Crow – 4:26
Almost Wisdom – 4:45
Sand and Gravel – 6:34
Nightdrive – 5:38
Hole In The Mountain – 3:49
Pass Me On Over – 4:10
Up In The Graveyard – 6:12
Promised – 6:33

Performers

The Walkabouts 
Glenn Slater - piano, organ, accordion, loops
Michael Wells - bass guitar, harmonica
Terri Moeller - drums, percussion, backup vocals
Carla Torgerson - vocals, acoustic & electric guitars, cello
Chris Eckman - vocals, electric & acoustic guitars, lyrics

Additional musicians 
Larry Barrett - mandolin (11,12), lap steel (4,5)
Bruce Wirth - violin (7)
Andrew Hare - pedal steel (12)

Tiny Hot Orchestra Horns
horn section on track 9
Zach Permeson - trombone (9)
Mark Condelaria - tenor sax (9)
Marcus Membrane - trumpet (9)
"Dutch Beef" Sout - tenor sax (9)

References

1994 albums
The Walkabouts albums
Sub Pop albums
Albums recorded at Robert Lang Studios